Terho is a Finnish surname, which may refer to:

 Casper Terho (born 2003), Finnish footballer
Emma Terho (born 1981), Finnish retired ice hockey defenseman
 Johannes Terho (1885-1961), Finnish chess player
 Olga Terho (1910-2003), Finnish politician
 Sampo Terho (born 1977), Finnish politician

Finnish-language surnames